Milford Wriarson Howard (December 18, 1862 – December 28, 1937) was a United States Representative from Alabama.

Howard was first elected to the House of Representatives as a Populist in 1894. He was reelected in 1896 but did not seek another term in 1898.  Howard returned to his hometown of Fort Payne, Alabama to practice law.  In 1908, his name was put into nomination for the presidency at the first convention of the Independence Party in Chicago, but he finished third in the balloting to Thomas L. Hisgen.

He moved to California in 1918 to pursue literary efforts and worked briefly in the silent movie business. Meeting with Benito Mussolini in the late 1920s, Howard would become a committed fascist for the rest of his life. In 1934, he was one of the editors of The Awakener. Following his death in Los Angeles, his cremated remains were interred, along with those of his first wife, in a large rock, into which the Sallie Howard Chapel, a memorial to his first wife near Mentone, Alabama, was built.

See also
The Bishop of the Ozarks

References

External links 

 
 
 

1862 births
1937 deaths
19th-century American lawyers
19th-century American politicians
20th-century American lawyers
20th-century American politicians
Alabama lawyers
American fascists
Members of the United States House of Representatives from Alabama
People from Fort Payne, Alabama
People's Party members of the United States House of Representatives from Alabama
People from Rome, Georgia